Bil Zelman is an American photographer and director known for his powerful, candid portraiture and spontaneous, photojournalistic style. Zelman developed a highly stylized form of hard-flash street photography while in art school and Los Angeles Times art critic Leah Ollman compares the "psychological density" of his work to the likes of Garry Winogrand, Larry Fink, Diane Arbus and William Klein- photographers that are "purposely getting it wrong in one way so as to get it right in another, disrupting visual order to ignite a kind of visceral disorder".

In 2020 Daylight Books published And Here We Are- Stories From the Sixth Extinction, a collection of noir landscapes and writings about the current extinction crisis with a foreword by Pulitzer Prize-winning biologist E. O. Wilson.

"Equally striking as it is meaningful, this powerful work is a critical reminder that the alarms are not ringing loudly enough for many of us to hear"  stated Alexandra Cousteau. The monograph was awarded the International Center of Photography Deeper Perspectives Award.

Zelman published Isolated Gesture in 2013, a collection of highly stylized black and white street photography. The book was chosen for an Art Directors Club award by Albert Watson,

Artweek portrays Isolated Gesture as "a cross between S. E. Hinton's The Outsiders and Dutch genre painting". Referencing Zelman's distinctive style, Los Angeles Times  proclaims that Zelman's guiding principle is having an intense proximity to his subject, "He doesn't shoot in a war zone but in the realm of ordinary life--on the street, at parties, in restaurants and stores. Working aggressively close to his subjects, and rapidly, intensifies whatever is in front of the camera".

Zelman has photographed and directed myriad campaigns for clients ranging from Apple to Coca-Cola to Levi's and is ranked Top 200 Photographers Worldwide by Lürzer's Archive.

Selected exhibitions and permanent collections
 2022 And Here We Are, Interactive Installation, PhEST, Monopoli, Italy
 2021 And Here We Are, Multi-Media show, Cortona On the Move, Italy
 2021 A Nature Story, Deeper Perspectives Award, Lucie Awards 
 2020 And Here We Are, Awarded Bronze for Books, Prix de’ la’ Photographie, Paris
 2016 American Sand, Lucie Foundation, Month of Photography
 2015 Isolated Gesture, Sparks Gallery, San Diego, California
 2010  Dusk, Lucie Foundation, Los Angeles, California
 2010 Museum of Photographic Arts, San Diego, California
 2008 Portland Museum of Art, Portland, Oregon
 2007 Isolated Gesture at Blue Sky Gallery, Portland, Oregon
 2007 FCMOA "Interactions" Exhibit, Ft. Collins, Colorado
 2007 Newspace Center for Photography, Portland, Oregon
 2006 Isolated Gesture Voice 1156 Gallery, Los Angeles
 2005 Center for Photographic Arts, Carmel, California
 2005 Museum of Photographic Arts, San Diego, California
 2002 Isolated Gesture, University of California, San Diego, California
 2001 Street Work Nicole Dintamin Gallery, Los Angeles, California

References

External links
 Official Zelman Studios homepage
 Billboard.com 
 Los Angeles Times
 Lüerzers Archive
 Risen Magazine
 PDN Photo District News
 A Photo Editor
 Process Magazine
 Strobist
 Saatchi Online
 Shutterbug

1972 births
Living people
University at Buffalo alumni
American photographers
Artists from Pittsburgh
People from Troy, New York
Film directors from New York (state)